Nayaji (also Romanized as Nayajī; also known as Nayaj and Nīach) is a village in Malfejan Rural District, in the Central District of Siahkal County, Gilan Province, Iran. At the 2006 census, its population was 113, in 28 families.

References 

Populated places in Siahkal County